The Triumph of Science over Death, also known as Scientia, is a clay sculpture made by José Rizal as a gift to his friend Ferdinand Blumentritt.

The statue depicts a young, nude woman with flowing hair, standing on a skull while bearing a torch. The woman symbolizes the ignorance of humankind during the Dark Ages of history, while the torch she bears symbolizes the enlightenment science brings to the world. The woman stands atop a skull, a symbol of death, to signify the victory that humankind aims to achieve by conquering the bane of death through scientific advancement.

The original sculpture is now displayed at the Rizal Shrine Museum at Fort Santiago in Intramuros, Manila. A large replica, made of concrete, stands in front of Fernando Calderón Hall of the University of the Philippines College of Medicine along Pedro Gil St. in Ermita, Manila. Another replica is found outside the old Department of Health research facility in Muntinlupa and now incorporated into the design of the ongoing expansion of Festival Supermall.

The motif of the statue is also used by various medical associations in the Philippines as their symbol, the most notable of which is the Philippine College of Surgeons.

See also
Women in Philippine art

References

Works by José Rizal
Clay sculptures
19th-century sculptures